The Rhode Island Wing of the Civil Air Patrol (CAP) is the highest echelon of Civil Air Patrol in the state of Rhode Island. Rhode Island Wing headquarters are located in Cranston, Rhode Island. The Rhode Island Wing consists of over 170 cadet and adult members operating from 6 locations across the state of Rhode Island.

Mission
The Civil Air Patrol has three primary missions: aerospace education, cadet programs, and emergency services.

Emergency services
The Civil Air Patrol is responsible for providing emergency services including air and ground search and rescue, disaster relief, counter-drug operations, and homeland security missions. CAP aircraft fly non-combat homeland security missions, including observing critical infrastructure, providing an airborne communications relay, and the airlifting of important cargo. CAP units provide impact assessment, light transport, communications support and low-level route surveys for the Air Force

Cadet programs
The Civil Air Patrol offers a cadet program for youth aged 12 to 21, which includes aerospace education, leadership training, physical fitness and moral leadership.
Cadets meet on average 2 hours per week and one Saturday per month, and also have opportunities to attend leadership encampments, career academies, and other activities during the summer.

Aerospace education
The Civil Air Patrol offers aerospace education for CAP members and the general public, including providing training to the members of CAP through the cadet program, and offering workshops for youth throughout the nation through schools and public aviation events. Each year, the Civil Air Patrol supports approximately 200 aerospace education workshops for teachers at approximately 100 colleges and universities around the country, preparing an estimated 5,000 teachers to teach aerospace-related subjects in their classrooms.

Organization

See also
Awards and decorations of the Civil Air Patrol
Rhode Island Air National Guard
Rhode Island Army National Guard
Rhode Island State Guard
United States Coast Guard Auxiliary

References

External links
Rhode Island Wing Civil Air Patrol official website

Wings of the Civil Air Patrol
Education in Rhode Island
Military in Rhode Island